Presidential elections are scheduled to take place in Turkey on 14 May 2023 as part of the 2023 general elections, alongside parliamentary elections. Voters will elect a new president for a term of five years. President Erdoğan initially signalled that the election might be held early on 14 May 2023, a reference to the 1950 general election that previously ended Turkey's one-party regime under the Republican People's Party (CHP). However, the dating was initially brought to uncertainty following the deadly 2023 Turkey–Syria earthquake which led to calls for postponement of the election date. On 10 March 2023, Erdoğan signed the decree for the elections to be held on 14 May 2023.

Background

2018 elections

The previous Turkish general election took place on 24 June 2018. The election marked the country's transition from a parliamentary system to a presidential one, as narrowly endorsed by voters in the controversial 2017 constitutional referendum. That election resulted in a victory for incumbent president Recep Tayyip Erdoğan, who had held the position since 2014. Meanwhile, the ruling Justice and Development Party (AKP) lost its absolute majority in the Grand National Assembly of Turkey for the first time since June 2015, forcing it to rely on its coalition partner, the Nationalist Movement Party (MHP) of Devlet Bahçeli, to pass legislation.

Date 
The regular scheduled date for the first round of the elections was set for 18 June 2023. However, the electoral system allowed for moving the date forward.

In 2020, there were speculations about a snap election prior to the regular one in 2023. At the time, Devlet Bahçeli, the leader of coalition partner MHP, ruled them out. In a written statement, he said that elections would not be held before 2023. He also confirmed that the current coalition between AKP and MHP will remain intact and Recep Tayyip Erdoğan will be their joint nominee for President.

Discussion on snap elections 
In early January 2023 the AKP mentioned eventual snap elections to take place on either the 16 or 30 April or the 14 May. But the so called "Table of Six" composed by six opposition parties announced that they would not agree to snap elections after the 6 April. On 18 January 2023, Erdoğan, the President of Turkey, signalled that the elections will be held earlier than the scheduled date, specifically on 14 May 2023, in a symbolic reference to the election victory of former President Adnan Menderes on 14 May in the 1950 Turkish general election, beating the candidate of the (then governing) party CHP. On 22 January 2023, Erdoğan stated that the elections will be held on 14 May. In view of that date, the Table of Six announced that Erdogan can not run for president without the consent of the parliament.

Discussion on postponing election date 
After an earthquake struck the country in February 2023, Erdogan announced a state of emergency for 10 affected provinces, which would end a week ahead of the election date of the 14 May. The opposition voted against the imposition in parliament. Then on 13 February 2023, Bülent Arınç, a former AKP Member of Parliament, alleged the elections could not be held in the current situation in either May or June, and the elections should be postponed. AKP spokesperson Ömer Çelik responded that Arınç's statement is his own personal view and does not bind the party. Kemal Kılıçdaroğlu from the opposition party Republican People's Party (CHP) responded to Arınç's statement that the constitution would not provide a possibility to postpone the elections except in the case of war. Further Mustafa Tolga Öztürk from the Good Party reasoned only the parliament has the authority to postpone elections and Selahattin Demirtaş from the Peoples' Democratic Party (HDP) suspected such a measure would result in a political coup.

Electoral system
The President of Turkey is directly elected through the two-round system, under which a candidate must obtain a simple majority (more than 50%) of the popular vote in order to be elected. If no candidate secures an overall majority outright, then a runoff is held between the two most voted-for candidates from the first round, the winner of which is then declared elected. The first direct election to the Turkish presidency was held in 2014, after a referendum in 2007 abolished the previous system under which the head of state was elected by the legislature, the Grand National Assembly of Turkey. The President of Turkey is subject to term limits, and may serve at most two times five-year terms. If snap elections were held before the end of the second term, a third term would be permitted. Snap elections can be held either with the consent of 60% of the MPs in the Grand National Assembly of Turkey or ordered by presidential decree. Only snap elections via the consent of the Grand National Assembly during a president's second term can allow the president a third term In February 2022 Mustafa Sentop, the Parliamentary Speaker of the Grand National Assembly of Turkey claimed Erdoğan could run for a third presidency despite of the existing two term-limit to the presidency in the Turkish constitution. Şelçuk Özdag of the Future Party argued that the Government wants to violate the constitution with his candidacy as Erdoğan was already elected twice. 

Prospective presidential candidates must be at least 40 years old and must have completed higher education. Any political party that has won 5% of the vote in the previous parliamentary election can put forward a candidate, although parties that have not met this threshold can form alliances and field joint candidates as long as their total vote share exceeds 5%. Independents can run if they collect 100,000 signatures from the electorate.

Candidates

Declared
Recep Tayyip Erdoğan, incumbent President of Turkey (2014-present)
Supported by: Nationalist Movement Party, Great Unity Party, Free Cause Party
Kemal Kılıçdaroğlu, leader of Republican People's Party, leader of the opposition. Ekrem İmamoğlu, Mansur Yavaş and the leaders of five parties in the Nation Alliance are named as vice-president candidates.
Supported by: Nation Alliance, Mustafa Sarıgül (Leader of Party for Change in Turkey), Muharrem İnce (Second round), Workers' Party of Turkey, Liberal Democratic Party, Democratic Left Party (Some members), People's Liberation Party, Communist Party of Turkey Independent Turkey Party, National Path Party, People's Democratic Party
Cem Uzan, former leader of the Young Party (GP)
Muharrem İnce, leader of the Homeland Party, candidate for president in 2018
 Sinan Oğan, former member of the parliament from MHP (2011–2015) (running as Independent)
 Supported by Ancestral Alliance
 Doğu Perinçek, leader of Patriotic Party, candidate for president in 2018
 Supported by

Declined to be candidates 
 Devlet Bahçeli, leader of Nationalist Movement Party, Deputy Prime Minister (1999-2002)
 Ekrem İmamoğlu, Mayor of Istanbul (2019-present), Mayor of Beylikdüzü district (2014-2019)
 Mansur Yavaş, 29th Mayor of Ankara (2019-present), Mayor of Beypazarı district (1999-2009) 
 Meral Akşener, leader of the Good Party, Minister of Interior (1996-1997), candidate for president in 2018,

Candidates and parties

Presidential candidates

Endorsements

Parties

International organizations

Controversies

Erdoğan's third term 
The leaders of the six political parties making up the "Table of Six" coalition declared that it is not legal for President Recep Tayyip Erdoğan to run for president for a third term unless there is a Parliament (TBMM) decision.

Assassination threats 
Kemal Kılıçdaroğlu received assassination threats by a unknown groups and was offered a minister’s armored vehicle by the government but he rejected the proposal and kept his official car

Opinion polls

See also
 List of elections in 2023

References

Presidential elections in Turkey
 
Turkey
Turkey
Turkey
Turkey
Future elections in Turkey